Buckingham by-election may refer to one several parliamentary by-elections held in England for the House of Commons constituency of Buckingham:

1889 Buckingham by-election
1891 Buckingham by-election
1937 Buckingham by-election
1943 Buckingham by-election

See also 
 Buckingham (UK Parliament constituency)